T mesons are hypothetical mesons composed of a top quark and either an up, down, strange, charm antiquark or bottom antiquark.
Because of the top quark's short lifetime, T mesons are not expected to be found in nature. The combination of a top quark and top antiquark is not an open T meson, but rather a closed top-quark meson called toponium. Each T meson has an antiparticle that is composed of a top antiquark and an up, down, strange, charm quark or bottom quark respectively.

References

External links
W.-M. Yao et al. (Particle Data Group), J. Phys. G 33, 1 (2006) and 2007 partial update for edition 2008 (URL: http://pdg.lbl.gov)

Mesons
Hypothetical composite particles